Bolshoye Sudachye is a rural locality (a selo) and the administrative center of Bolshesudachenskoye Rural Settlement, Rudnyansky District, Volgograd Oblast, Russia. The population was 1,080 as of 2010. There are 10 streets.

Geography 
Bolshoye Sudachye is located in steppe, on the Khopyorsko-Buzulukskaya Plain, 41 km northwest of Rudnya (the district's administrative centre) by road. Matyshevo is the nearest rural locality.

References 

Rural localities in Rudnyansky District, Volgograd Oblast
Atkarsky Uyezd